Priuralsky (masculine), Priuralskaya (feminine), or Priuralskoye (neuter) is the name of several rural localities in Russia:
Priuralsky, Komi Republic, a settlement in Priuralsky Rural-Type Settlement Administrative Territory of Troitsko-Pechorsky District of the Komi Republic
Priuralsky, Orenburg Oblast, a settlement in Priuralsky Selsoviet of Orenburgsky District of Orenburg Oblast
Priuralskoye, a selo in Priuralskoye Selo Administrative Territory under the administrative jurisdiction of the town of republic significance of Pechora in the Komi Republic

See also
Uralsk